The 2011–12 season is Hull City's second consecutive season back in the Championship after relegation from the Premier League in the 2009–10 season. They also competed in the League Cup and the FA Cup.

Events
On 15 November 2011 manager Nigel Pearson left the club to take up an appointment at former club Leicester City, taking with him backroom staff Craig Shakespeare and Steve Walsh. Hull City appointed Nick Barmby as caretaker manager.
On 18 November it was announced that Steve Wigley would be rejoining the club's backroom staff as first-team coach. On 6 January 2012 Barmby announced that he would be retiring as a player. On 10 January 2012 he was appointed as permanent manager of the club.

On 31 March 2012, during a match against Coventry City, captain Jack Hobbs suffered a rupture to his anterior cruciate ligament, an injury which at the time was set to keep him out of action for up to eight months. As a result of this Andy Dawson took over the role of captain for the remainder of the season.

On 1 May 2012, in a statement by club owners Assem and Ehab Allam, it was confirmed that a consultancy agreement with Adam Pearson had been terminated. A week later, Barmby was sacked as manager after publicly criticising the club's owners in an interview given to a local newspaper. The termination of his contract was ratified after an appeal on 24 May 2012.

At a press conference on 8 June 2012 it was announced that Steve Bruce had been appointed as the new manager on a three-year contract. Subsequently, first team coaches Steve Wigley and Stuart Watkiss left the club.

Players

Current squad

Out on loan

Results

Pre-season

Championship

League table

Result round by round

League Cup

Hull City received a home match against League Two side Macclesfield Town in the first round of the League Cup drawn on 16 June 2011.
The match took place on 9 August 2011 at the KC Stadium.

FA Cup

Hull City enter the competition at the Third Round Proper stage with matches taking place in early January 2012. The draw for the round took place on 4 December 2011 and Hull were given a home tie against Ipswich Town. The match took place on 7 January 2012 at the KC Stadium and Hull won 3–1.
 The draw for the fourth round took place the following day and Hull were drawn at home against League Two newcomers Crawley Town. The match took place on 28 January 2012 at the KC Stadium and Hull lost out to a 57-minute goal by Matt Tubbs.

Statistics

Captains

Appearances

|-
|colspan="14"|Players featured for Hull this season who are currently out on loan:

|-
|colspan="14"|Players featured for Hull this season who have retired:

Disciplinary record

Top scorers

Transfers
This section only lists transfers and loans for the 2011–12 season, which began 1 July 2011. For transactions in May and June 2011, see transfers and loans for the 2010–11 season.

Players in

Players out

Loans in

Loans out

Kits

The new away kit was revealed on 16 July 2011 in Hull city centre.

For the 2011–12 season, the main kit sponsor is Cash Converters and it is manufactured by Adidas.

Awards
The end of season awards were made on the pitch following the end of the final home game of the season against Nottingham Forest on 21 April 2012.
Robert Koren was voted as the Player of the Season, closely followed by James Chester, with Jack Hobbs taking third place. James Chester took the prize for Players Player of the Year and the Goal of the Season was taken by 
Robert Koren for his goal against Leicester City on 3 December 2011.

References

Hull City A.F.C. seasons
Hull City
2010s in Kingston upon Hull